"Oopsy Daisy" is a song by British rapper Chipmunk. It features uncredited vocals by R&B singer Dayo Olatunji, who performs the bridge and chorus. The song was produced by the pop production duo Kyle James & Parker Ighile, who co-wrote the top line alongside Talay Riley. The song was officially released on 4 October 2009. An official remix has been made with Boy Better Know.

The song reached number one on the UK Singles Chart on 11 October 2009. Chipmunk's love interest in the music video is played by the British actress Red Madrell.

Critical reception
Fraser McAlpine of BBC Chart Blog gave the song a positive review and 4 stars stating: "You've got to hand it to Chipmunk, there aren't many rappers who can stand out for having particularly strong self-confidence, in a field which is dominated by mirror-kissing loudmouths. Rappers are the only people in the world who, if history was run again from the start, would've invented a soft drink with their name on it before fire. And yet, there's something about this dapper chap's particular form of audacity which never really comes across like proper arrogance. For his latest, the Chipster is sad because he has been hurt by a girl. The way he gets this across is to play some contemplative piano, and to get a lady singer to sing "I'm a walking disaster" and "all I'll do is hurt you again", so he doesn't come across as being some emotionless thug who'd dump a girl for wearing the wrong shade of lipstick. It's her fault, actually!". Digital Spy awarded the song 3/5 stars and said of the song: "Following the top ten success of 'Diamond Rings', Chipmunk hasn't broken ranks from his winning formula. His lyrics about the woes of puppy love, "Baseball love, three strikes you're out, you're too busy trying to catch me out", may be a side-step away from boyband cheese, but thanks to some lush harmonies from Ms D and an infectious piano hook, 'Oopsy Daisy' sounds like another hit. The future of grime? Probably not. A decent pop career ahead? Almost certainly".

Track listing
 CD single / Digital download
 "Oopsy Daisy" - 3:39
 "Oopsy Daisy" (Boy Better Know Remix) - 3:09

Chart performance
The song sold 82,000 copies in its first week in the UK and managed to beat the lead single of girl band The Saturdays second album to the top spot. In the UK R&B Chart Oopsy Daisy debuted and peaked at #1 and stayed there for a 5 weeks. On 30 November 2009 Chipmunk went to Twitter to announce that Oopsy Daisy had sold over 200,000 copies in less than 2 months of its release, to this date the single has sold over 500,000 copies in the UK and 50,000 around the world.

Charts and certifications

Weekly charts

Year-end charts

Decade-end charts

Certifications

Release history

See also
List of number-one singles from the 2000s (UK)
List of number-one R&B hits of 2009 (UK)

References 

2009 singles
Chipmunk (rapper) songs
Dyo (singer) songs
Number-one singles in Scotland
UK Singles Chart number-one singles
Songs written by Talay Riley
2009 songs